The Museum Card (Dutch: "Museumkaart") is a personal card that allows subscribers free entry to about 400 museums in the Netherlands. The card is valid for one year. In 2013, there were more than 900,000 cardholders. In 2011, over 23% of visitors to the affiliated museums had Museum Cards (4.3 million to 18.1 million).

As of 2019, the card costs €64.90 (including €4.95 administrative expenses) for adults,  A discounted card is available for youth under age 19, costing €32.45 (including €4.95 administrative expenses).

Conditions 

The Museum Card is available at many of the larger participating museums, or can also be purchased online. Museumkaart holders may register to receive a monthly digital magazine.

Buying the card online is only possible if the user has a Dutch IBAN and a registered Dutch address. If buying the card from a museum, a temporary card, valid for 31 days or 5 visits, is issued. A confirmation photo must then be uploaded online to receive the 1-year card.

Although most museums offer free entry to Museum Card holders, some museums charge a small fee. Additionally, some museums charge an additional fee for special exhibitions, but not for the general collection.

Mission 

The Museum Card is issued by the Dutch Museum Association. The card promotes repeat visits and increases the bond between museums and their visitors. The operation of the card is conducted by the Museum Card Foundation (SMK), which also organizes Museum Weekend, and supports the marketing of affiliated museums. The income of the foundation benefits the participating museums. Affiliated museums are recognized in the Dutch Museum Register and are members of the Dutch Museum Association.

Participating museums 

The Museum Card is available to buy at many of the participating museums below. It was noteworthy that the main web page for the Museum Card was available in Dutch only and it did not provide any translation, however there are now currently translations into English and German.

Amsterdam 
In Amsterdam, the participating museums are as follows. Many of these museums are part of the Official Museums of Amsterdam, including the Cobra Museum (located in Amstelveen) and the Zaans Museum (located in Zaandam). 
 Allard Pierson Museum
 Amsterdam City Archives
 Amsterdam Museum
 Biblical Museum/Cromhout houses 
 de Appel
 De Burcht / Vakbondsmuseum
 Diamond Museum Amsterdam
 The Dutch Maritime Museum
 EnergeticA
 Eye
 Foam Fotografiemuseum Amsterdam
 Museum Geelvinck-Hinlopen 
 Hermitage Amsterdam
 Museum Het Schip
 National Holocaust Memorial, Hollandsche Schouwberg
 Huis Marseille
 Jewish Historical Museum
 JHM Children's Museum
 Max Euwe Centrum
 NEMO
 Nieuwe Kerk
 Ons' Lieve Heer op Solder
 Oude Kerk
 Pijpenkabinet & Smokiana
 Portuguese Synagogue
 Press Museum
 Rembrandt House Museum
 Rijksmuseum
 Royal Palace of Amsterdam
 Special collections at the Amsterdam University Library
 Stedelijk Museum
 Theatermuseum / Theater Instituut Nederland
 Museum tot zover
 Museum of the Tropics
 Van Gogh Museum
 Museum Van Loon
 Verzetsmuseum
 Museum Willet-Holthuysen

Rotterdam 
 Belasting and Douane Museum
 Chabot Museum
 Het Nieuwe Instituut
 Kunsthal Rotterdam
 Nederlands Fotomuseum
 Netherlands Architecture Institute
 Mariniersmuseum
 Maritiem Museum
 Museum Boijmans van Beuningen
 Museum Rotterdam
 TENT Rotterdam
 Trompenburg Tuinen & Arboretum
 Wereldmuseum
 Witte de With

Utrecht 
 Aboriginal Art Museum, Utrecht (now permanently closed)
  Basis voor Actuele Kunst, (BAK)
 Botanische Tuinen, Utrecht
 Centraal Museum, Utrecht
 Museum Catharijneconvent
 Museum Speelklok
 Nederlands Volksbuurtmuseum
 Train Museum, Utrecht
 Sonnenborgh
 Spoorwegmuseum
 Universiteitsmuseum, Utrecht

The Hague 
 De Mesdag Collectie
 Fotomuseum de Haag
 Gem
 Gemeentemuseum Den Haag (Municipal Museum)
 Museum de Gevangenpoort (Prison Gate Museum)
 Haags Historisch Museum (Hague Historical Museum)
 Humanity House
 Kinderboekenmuseum
 Letterkundig Museum
 Louis Couperus Museum
 Louwman Museum
 Mauritshuis, The Hague
 Museon, The Hague
 Museum Beelden aan Zee
 Museum Bredius
 Museum Meermanno
 Museum voor Communicatie
 Nationaal Archief
 Panorama Mesdag

Haarlem 
 Frans Hals Museum, Haarlem
 Teylers Museum, Haarlem
 Historisch Museum Haarlem
 Museum De Hallen, Haarlem

Leiden 
 Boerhaave Museum, Leiden
 National Museum of Antiquities, Leiden (Homepage)
 National Museum of Ethnology, Leiden (Homepage)
 Naturalis, Leiden (Homepage)
 Stedelijk Museum de Lakenhal, Leiden

Leeuwarden 
 Fries Museum, Leeuwarden
 Princessehof, Leeuwarden (Homepage)

Elsewhere 
In other parts of the Netherlands:
 Kaas(Cheese) Museum, Alkmaar
 Stedelijk Museum Alkmaar, Alkmaar
 Cobra Museum, Amstelveen (Homepage)
 Museum Jan van der Jogt, Amstelveen
 Drents Museum, Assen (Homepage)
 Museum Klok en Peel, Asten
 Kranenburgh, Bergen
 Afrika Museum, Berg en Dal
 Titus Brandsma Museum, Bolsward
 Museeaquarium Delfzijl, Delfzijl
 Prinsenhof, Delft
 Schatkamer van Deventer, Deventer
 Het Dordts Particiërshuis, Dordecht
 Historisch Museum Ede, Ede
 Van Abbemuseum, Eindhoven
 Streekmuseum de Schippersbeurs, Elsloo
 Flessenscheepjes Museum, Enkhuizen
 RijksmuseumTwenthe, Enschede (Homepage)
 Twentsewelle, Enschede
 Museum Martena, Franeker
 Museum ‘De Roos’, Geertruidenberg
 Museum Opsterlän, Gorredijk
 Graafs Museum, Grave
 Groninger Museum, Groningen (Homepage)
 Museum de Koperen Kop, Hardinxveld-Giessendam
 Thermenmuseum, Heerlen
 Halve Maen, Hoorn
 Het Bolwerk, Ijzendijke
 Stedelijk Museum Kampen, Kampen
 Discovery Center Continium, Kerkade
 Naturalis, Leiden
 Museum Volkenkunde, Leiden
 Aviodrome (Aviation museum), Lelystad (Homepage)
 Bonnefanten Museum, Maastricht (Homepage)
 Museum Betje Wolff, Middenbeemster
 Waterlandsmuseum Speeltoren, Monnickendam
 Comenius Museum, Naarden
 Valkhof Museum, Nijmegen
 Museum Noordwijk, Noordwijk
 Airborne Museum Hartenstein, Oosterbeek
 Speelgoed Museum op Stelten, Oosterhout
 Brabants Museum Oud-Oosterhout, Oosterhout
 Openluchtmuseum Ootmarsum Het Land van Heeren en Boeren, Ootmarsum
 Kaap Sil, Museum van Jutters en Zee, Oudeschild
 Slot Loevestein, Poederoijen
 Museum Slager, 'S-Hertogenbosch
 Flipje- en Streekmuseum Tiel, Tiel
 Museum Het Oude Raadhuis, Urk
 Miramar Zeemuseum, Vledder
 National Monument Kamp Vught, Vught
 Zaanse Schans, Zaanstad
 Stadskasteel, Zaltbommel
 Stadsmuseum Woerden, Woerden

Usage

See also 
 International Council of Museums (ICOM)
 List of museums in the Netherlands
 Official Museums of Amsterdam

References

External links 
 Museumkaart 

Museums in the Netherlands
Tourism in the Netherlands